Harper Page Marshall is an English voice actress. She is known for her role as Hermione Granger in the video games of Harry Potter and the Philosopher's Stone, Harry Potter and the Chamber of Secrets, Harry Potter and the Prisoner of Azkaban, Harry Potter and the Goblet of Fire and Harry Potter and the Order of the Phoenix. She also provided the voice for Malice: A Kat's Tale.

Filmography
Harry Potter and the Philosopher's Stone (2001) - Hermione Granger
Harry Potter and the Chamber of Secrets (2002) - Hermione Granger
Harry Potter and the Prisoner of Azkaban (2004) - Hermione Granger
Malice: A Kat's Tale (2004) - Additional voices
Harry Potter and the Goblet of Fire (2005) - Hermione Granger
Harry Potter and the Order of the Phoenix (2007) - Hermione Granger

References

External links
 

Living people
English video game actresses
Year of birth missing (living people)